Indocypraea is a genus of flowering plants belonging to the family Asteraceae.

Its native range is Indian subcontinent to Southern China and Indo-China, Jawa.

Species
Species:
 Indocypraea montana (Blume) Orchard

References

Asteraceae
Asteraceae genera